Sidney Bowman (June 8, 1907 – April 29, 1986) was an American athlete. He competed in the men's triple jump at the 1928 Summer Olympics and the 1932 Summer Olympics.

References

External links
 

1907 births
1986 deaths
Athletes (track and field) at the 1928 Summer Olympics
Athletes (track and field) at the 1932 Summer Olympics
American male triple jumpers
Olympic track and field athletes of the United States
Place of birth missing
20th-century American people